Celaenorrhinus chrysoglossa, commonly known as central sprite, is a species of butterfly in the family Hesperiidae. It is found in Nigeria (the Cross River loop), Cameroon, the Republic of the Congo, the Central African Republic and the Democratic Republic of the Congo. The habitat consists of primary forests.

References

Butterflies described in 1891
chrysoglossa
Butterflies of Africa